Michael "Mike" Seatter (born Jerrey Michael Henry Falvey) (4 September 1945 – 5 December 2008) was a rugby union, and professional association football (soccer), and rugby league footballer who played in the 1960s and 1970s.

Background
Michael Seatter was born in Newark-on-Trent, Nottinghamshire, England, and he died aged 63 from Leukaemia in Poitiers, France.

Rugby league playing career

Club career
Michael Seatter made his début for Wakefield Trinity against Halifax at Belle Vue, Wakefield in 1967, he played his last match for Wakefield Trinity during the 1968–69 season, he appears to have scored no drop-goals (or field-goals as they are currently known in Australasia), but prior to the 1974–75 season all goals, whether; conversions, penalties, or drop-goals, scored 2-points, consequently prior to this date drop-goals were often not explicitly documented, therefore '0' drop-goals may indicate drop-goals not recorded, rather than no drop-goals scored.

Association football (soccer) playing career

Muratti Vase
Michael Seatter played as a winger in Jersey's 4-1 victory over Guernsey in the 1973 Muratti Final at The Track, Guernsey, and in the 1-2 defeat (after extra time) in the 1974 Muratti Final Springfield Stadium, Jersey.

References

External links
Search for "Seatter" at rugbyleagueproject.org

1945 births
2008 deaths
Association football wingers
Barry Town United F.C. players
English footballers
English rugby league players
English rugby union players
Jersey footballers
Llandaff RFC players
People from Newark and Sherwood (district)
Rugby union players from Nottinghamshire
Footballers from Nottinghamshire
Rugby league players from Nottinghamshire
Rugby league wingers
Rugby union players from Newark-on-Trent
Wakefield Trinity players